Blake Jonathan Kyd (born 10 June 1988) is a South African rugby union player, currently playing with the . His regular position is prop.

Career

References

1988 births
Living people
Alumni of Maritzburg College
Border Bulldogs players
Rugby union players from Pietermaritzburg
Rugby union props
South African rugby union players